Niurka Montalvo Amaro (born June 4, 1968, in Havana) is a former Cuban and Spanish athlete who specialised in the long jump and triple jump events. Her greatest achievement came in 1999, when she became world champion with a personal best jump of 7.06 metres. She was the autonomous secretary of sport for the Autonomous government of Valencia.

Career

Early life
She began her international career with a medal at the 1986 Pan American Junior Championships, taking the bronze in the long jump. Senior medals soon followed: at the Central American and Caribbean Championships she won the long jump gold at the 1987 edition, and another gold came at the 1990 Central American and Caribbean Games.

Her first appearance at global level came at the 1991 IAAF World Indoor Championships, where she finished fifth in the long jump. She demonstrated further skills when she scored a double gold in the long jump and triple jump events at both the 1993 Central American and Caribbean Championships in Athletics and the 1993 Central American and Caribbean Games. That year she went on to become the Summer Universiade champion in the triple jump and just missed out on the medals with a fourth-place finish at the 1993 World Championships in Athletics. She represented America at the 1994 IAAF World Cup and won the long jump silver behind Inessa Kravets with a best mark of 6.70 m.

The 1995 season was a breakthrough for Montalvo as she won triple jump silver and long jump at the 1995 Pan American Games before going on to win her first world medal – a jump of 6.86 m brought her a silver medal behind Fiona May in the long jump final at the 1995 World Championships in Athletics. She had mixed fortunes in triple jump that year, finishing sixth at the 1995 IAAF World Indoor Championships, but fifteenth in the qualifiers of the outdoor championships.

The few years following her world silver she focused solely on the long jump, but to limited success: she failed to make it out of the qualifying round at either the 1996 Summer Olympics or the 1997 IAAF World Indoor Championships and a fifth place at the 1998 IAAF Grand Prix Final was a modest highlight to a year.

Transfer to Spain
In 1999 she acquired Spanish citizenship by marriage, something which stirred a great amount of controversy. The move brought renewed efforts on the world stage as she became the world champion in the long jump with a gold medal at the 1999 World Championships in Athletics. The Cuban Athletics Federation blocked her participation in the 2000 Summer Olympics, and in addition, she was reportedly included on a list of possible assassination targets for ETA.

Montalvo refused to let this disrupt her athletics career and she won a series of bronze medals after this, starting with the 2000 IAAF Grand Prix Final and then at the 2001 IAAF World Indoor Championships and the 2001 World Championships in Athletics. More medals came at regional competitions, with a gold at the 2004 Ibero-American Championships and a silver behind her 1995 World Championships adversary, Fiona May, at the 2005 Mediterranean Games.

She finished seventh in the long jump final at the 2006 European Athletics Championships in Gothenburg at the age of 38.

Personal Bests
100 metres hurdles - 13.57 (1990)
Long jump - 7.06 (1999)
Triple jump - 14.60 (1994)

International competitions

References

External links

1968 births
Living people
Spanish female long jumpers
Cuban female long jumpers
Cuban female triple jumpers
Athletes (track and field) at the 1991 Pan American Games
Athletes (track and field) at the 1995 Pan American Games
Pan American Games gold medalists for Cuba
Pan American Games silver medalists for Cuba
Pan American Games medalists in athletics (track and field)
Athletes (track and field) at the 1996 Summer Olympics
Athletes (track and field) at the 2004 Summer Olympics
Olympic athletes of Cuba
Olympic athletes of Spain
World Athletics Championships medalists
World Athletics Championships athletes for Cuba
World Athletics Championships athletes for Spain
Cuban emigrants to Spain
Defecting sportspeople of Cuba
Mediterranean Games silver medalists for Spain
Athletes (track and field) at the 2005 Mediterranean Games
Universiade medalists in athletics (track and field)
Central American and Caribbean Games gold medalists for Cuba
Competitors at the 1990 Central American and Caribbean Games
Competitors at the 1993 Central American and Caribbean Games
Mediterranean Games medalists in athletics
Universiade gold medalists for Cuba
World Athletics Championships winners
Central American and Caribbean Games medalists in athletics
Medalists at the 1993 Summer Universiade
Competitors at the 1994 Goodwill Games
Competitors at the 2001 Goodwill Games
Medalists at the 1995 Pan American Games